Dominic Oppong (born January 21, 1986) is a Ghanaian-born Canadian former soccer player.

Career

College and Amateur
Oppong grew up in Scarborough, Ontario, attended St John Henry Newman CHS (Cardinal Newman CHS at the time), and played two years of college soccer at the University of Cincinnati, before transferring to the University at Buffalo prior to his junior year. He was an All-MAC Second Team selection in 2008.

During his college years Oppong also played for the Toronto Lynx in the USL Premier Development League. He made his Lynx debut on June 15, 2007 in a 4-0 defeat to the Michigan Bucks, and in 2008 helped the Lynx reach the playoffs for the first time since the 2000 season.

Professional
After leaving college, Oppong signed with Buffalo City of the National Premier Soccer League in 2009. He appeared in 19 matches and recorded one goal and added six assists for the team.

Oppong was among the new additional signings made by North York Astros head coach Vladimir Klinovsky midway through the 2009 CSL season to strengthen his squad as it attempted to qualify for the playoffs, but left the team after making only two appearances. He later played briefly for the Edmonton Drillers in the Canadian Major Indoor Soccer League.

On April 8, 2010, Oppong signed with the Harrisburg City Islanders of the USL Second Division. He made his debut for Harrisburg on May 7, against the Charlotte Eagles coming on as a substitute for Kai Kasiguran. After Harrisburg failed to secure a postseason berth he signed with Portugal FC of the Canadian Soccer League for the remainder of the 2010 season. Oppong signed with the new FC Edmonton side of the North American Soccer League on March 3, 2011. The club re-signed Oppong for the 2012 season on October 12, 2011.

After spending 2014 with Finnish side AC Oulu, Oppong returned to North America and signed with NASL side Atlanta Silverbacks on February 5, 2015. He made his debut for Atlanta on April 4 against Indy Eleven.

International
Oppong made his debut for the Canada U-20 men's national soccer team on December 6, 2005 in a game against Cameroon at the Francophone Games, and went on to appear in all three matches of their group stage.

Managerial career 
In 2019, Oppong became an academy coach for Sole Soccer Camp.

Club Statistics

Personal
Oppong's brother Victor was long-time member of several youth teams from Canadian Soccer Association and played for many teams in Germany including SV Waldhof Mannheim, SG Sonnenhof Großaspach, SV Sandhausen, 1. FC Saarbrücken and VfR Mannheim. In 2017, he served as an assistant coach under Julian de Guzman for USL side Ottawa Fury FC. After professional soccer he was employed as a personal trainer for Propel Performance  Institute.

References

External links
 Harrisburg City Islanders bio
 Buffalo City bio
 Cincinnati bio
 CanadaSoccer player profile

1986 births
Living people
Association football midfielders
Black Canadian soccer players
Buffalo Bulls men's soccer players
Ghanaian emigrants to Canada
Canadian Soccer League (1998–present) players
Canadian soccer players
Cincinnati Bearcats men's soccer players
FC Edmonton players
Penn FC players
North American Soccer League players
North York Astros players
Toronto Lynx players
University at Buffalo alumni
USL League Two players
USL Second Division players
Canada men's youth international soccer players
Atlanta Silverbacks players
SC Toronto players
Footballers from Kumasi
National Premier Soccer League players
AC Oulu players
Ykkönen players